The C.F. Mueller Company was founded in 1867 and built one of the biggest and most-advanced pasta factories in the United States at 180 Baldwin Avenue in Jersey City, New Jersey.  At one time, Mueller's Macaroni became the largest selling brand of pasta in America. It is owned by TreeHouse Foods.

From 1947 to 1976, Mueller was owned by the New York University School of Law; McKesson bought the C.F. Mueller Company in 1977; CPC International bought Mueller from McKesson in 1983.

CPC spun off its food division as Bestfoods in 1997; Unilever acquired Bestfoods in 2000. Mueller's was among the brands divested afterward, being sold to American Italian Pasta Company. American Italian Pasta Company was acquired by Ralcorp in 2010, which in turn was acquired by ConAgra Foods in 2013 and again to TreeHouse Foods in 2016.

References

External links

Companies based in Jersey City, New Jersey
Companies established in 1867
American pasta companies
New York University School of Law